Coach K College Basketball is the first college basketball video game developed by EA Sports spun off from their NBA Live engine. Coach K College Basketball was released in 1995 for Sega Genesis.

Gameplay
Coach K College Basketball is the only EA college basketball game to be produced for the Genesis. Endorsed by Duke head basketball coach Mike Krzyzewski, the game features 32 officially licensed teams in addition to eight classic teams. Among the 32 teams were Arizona, UCLA, Arkansas, UMass, Temple, Kentucky, Syracuse, and Kansas. The gameplay has received much criticism.

Reception
GamePro commented in their review that "With seven trips to the tournament semifinals under his belt, Krzyzweski knows his stuff, and so does EA Sports - this game takes Dick Vitale's College Hoops to the hole", citing the numerous options, customizable rules, realistic-styled sprites, and strong voice effects. The two sports reviewers of Electronic Gaming Monthly gave it scores of 8 out of 10 and 7 out of 10, praising the wide selection of teams, the multiplayer mode, and the use of plays and animations from the NBA Live engine.

Next Generation reviewed the Genesis version of the game, rating it four stars out of five, and stated that "this game is easily the best attempt yet at capturing this excitement of March Madness."

References

External links
Coach K College Basketball at IGN

1995 video games
EA Sports games
College basketball video games in the United States
North America-exclusive video games
Sega Genesis games
Sega Genesis-only games
Video games set in Alabama
Video games set in California
NCAA video games
Video games developed in the United States
Video games scored by Jeff van Dyck